Wong Chun-ting (born 7 September 1991) is a Hong Kong table tennis player. He won his first doubles title on the ITTF World Tour in 2012 and won another three doubles titles in 2014. In 2015, he won a bronze medal in mixed doubles event with Doo Hoi Kem at the World Championships. In 2016, he won a bronze medal in the singles event at the Men's World Cup. Since February 2017, his highest rank was number 6 in the world.

Wong started playing table tennis aged six against his brother. He joined a club at age nine.

About
Wong Chun-ting grew up in Shajiao Village, Sha Tin in his early years. He attended the school of Zhu Zhengxian Primary School of Baoliang Ju, Leshantang Yangge Xiaolin Middle School, and Lin Dahui Middle School.

In December 2017, Wong Chun-ting said in an interview that he was frankly ashamed of the world calling him "Champion". For him, the title of "Champion" requires an absolute in addition to rankings and medals. Leadership and influence, currently there is no such ability, hope to have in the future, this is also the goal he set for himself.

Competition results

References

External links

Living people
1991 births
Hong Kong male table tennis players
Table tennis players at the 2014 Asian Games
Table tennis players at the 2016 Summer Olympics
Olympic table tennis players of Hong Kong
World Table Tennis Championships medalists
Table tennis players at the 2018 Asian Games
Asian Games competitors for Hong Kong
Expatriate table tennis people in Japan
Table tennis players at the 2020 Summer Olympics